Vice Adm. James Walter Crawford III (born November 28, 1957) is a university administrator and former United States Navy officer, serving for 34 years before retiring. He is currently the president of Felician University in New Jersey, having assumed the role in June 2021.

He served as the 43rd Judge Advocate General (JAG) of the United States Navy from June 26, 2015, to September 12, 2018. He assumed that position after the retirement of Vice Admiral Nanette DeRenzi in June, 2015.

Early life
James W. Crawford III was born in Charlotte, North Carolina to James W. Crawford II and his wife. The younger Crawford would go on to be educated in Catholic schools, first by the Oblate Sisters of Providence and the Sisters of Mercy. He graduated from Belmont Abbey College in 1979 with a bachelor's degree in political science.

Career

He was commissioned through the Judge Advocate General (JAG) Corps Student Program and in 1983 graduated from the University of North Carolina School of Law at Chapel Hill. He later earned a Master of Laws in Ocean and Coastal Law from the University of Miami School of Law and a Master of Arts in National Security and Strategic Studies from the Naval War College.

Crawford served from 2012 to 2015 as the deputy judge advocate general of the Navy and commander, Naval Legal Service Command. As commander, Naval Legal Service Command, he led the judge advocates, enlisted legalmen and civilian employees of 14 commands worldwide, providing prosecution and defense services, legal assistance services to individuals and legal support to shore and afloat commands.

Crawford served from 2007 to 2011 as legal counsel to the chairman, Joint Chiefs of Staff. From 2011 to 2012, he served as commander, NATO Rule of Law Field Support Mission/Rule of Law Field Force-Afghanistan.

Before his appointment to flag rank, he served as special counsel to the chief of naval operations, the senior staff judge advocate for the commander, U.S. Pacific Command and as the fleet judge advocate for U.S. 7th Fleet. In command, he served as commanding officer, Region Legal Service Office Southeast.

Crawford also served at Navy Personnel Command; the Office of the Legal Counsel to the chairman of the Joint Chiefs of Staff; the Naval War College; commander, U.S. Naval Forces Europe; the Naval Justice School and Cruiser-Destroyer Group 8. He began his legal career as a defense counsel at the Naval Legal Service Trial Defense Activity, Naval Air Station Jacksonville.

Crawford was the 43rd Judge Advocate General of the Navy. Crawford is the principal military legal counsel to the Secretary of the Navy and Chief of Naval Operations and serves as the Department of Defense representative for ocean policy affairs (REPOPA). He led 2,300 attorneys, enlisted legalmen and civilian employees of the worldwide Navy JAG Corps community.

Crawford is a member of the state bar of North Carolina. His personal decorations include the Distinguished Service Medal, the Defense Superior Service Medal (three awards), the Legion of Merit (three awards), the Defense Meritorious Service Medal, the Meritorious Service Medal (two awards), the Navy and Marine Corps Commendation Medal (three awards) and the Navy and Marine Corps Achievement Medal.

Crawford's long career ended under a cloud. Less than two months prior to his retirement, the Navy Times reported on a ruling from the Court of Appeals for the Armed Forces that he had illegally influenced the prosecution of Senior Chief Special Warfare Operator Keith E. Barry (on charges of rape of a girlfriend). Senior Chief Barry's conviction was overturned on that appeal and dismissed with prejudice.

The Court of Appeals for the Armed Forces found Crawford's involvement constituted "unlawful influence."  In reaching this conclusion, the court applied Article 37 of the Uniform Code of Military Justice, which at the time of his conduct prohibited judge advocates (and others subject to the code) from "unlawfully influencing action of court." The appellate attorney for the exonerated Senior Chief urged that the Navy not allow for Crawford's upcoming retirement, but instead to place him on legal hold and go forward with a prosecution of Crawford for this charge of UCI.

Defense attorneys in other cases have alleged similar improper influence by Crawford.

According to his official US Navy biography, Crawford retired on November 1, 2018. There is no mention within his official biography of this appellate finding of UCI on his part.

Personal life 
Crawford is Catholic, and attended Nativity Church in Burke, Virginia before assuming the presidency at Felician.

References

External links

 Official U.S. Navy Biography 
 The Navy’s top lawyer unlawfully scuttled a SEAL’s case, court rules
 UNITED STATES COURT OF APPEALS FOR THE ARMED FORCES

Belmont Abbey College alumni
University of North Carolina School of Law alumni
United States Navy Judge Advocate General's Corps
University of Miami School of Law alumni
Naval War College alumni
United States Navy vice admirals
Living people
1957 births